"Enough" is the third and final single by Finnish vocalist Tarja Turunen from her debut album My Winter Storm, composed by Tarja and Michelle Leonard.

The single was released on March 9, 2009 by Universal Music as a digital download exclusive to the United Kingdom. The track is also available on the Fan Edition of My Winter Storm.

The single includes a new song (also available on the My Winter Storm Fan Edition) called "Wisdom of Wind". The song was composed by Jeff Rona and Lisa Gerrard, and recorded in China. It includes the participation of the Beijing Philharmonic and Qingdao Symphony orchestras.

"Enough" did not chart due to lack of promotion.

Music video
A music video for "Enough" was intended to be filmed following the South American tour, but because the director was in a car accident, its release was canceled.

Prior to that incident, the director mentioned the story of the video would be an autobiographical piece. In September 2008, a preview of the video appeared on YouTube, with Tarja singing in front of a green screen.

Track listing
 "Enough" (Single Version) - 4:00
 "Enough" (Album Version) - 5:14
 "Wisdom Of Wind" - 6:34

2009 singles
Songs written by Michelle Leonard
Tarja Turunen songs
Songs written by Tarja Turunen
2007 songs
Universal Music Group singles